Mihaylovo is a village in Northwestern Bulgaria.
It is located in Hayredin municipality, Vratsa Province.

See also
List of villages in Vratsa Province

Villages in Montana Province